North Washington is a city in Chickasaw County, Iowa, United States. The population was 112 at the time of the 2020 census.

Geography
North Washington is located at  (43.116252, -92.415178).

Demographics

2010 census

As of the census of 2010, there were 117 people, 43 households, and 31 families living in the city. The racial makeup of the city was 97.4% White, 1.7% African American, and 0.9% from other races. Hispanic or Latino of any race were 2.6% of the population.

There were 43 households, of which 44.2% had children under the age of 18 living with them, 65.1% were married couples living together, 2.3% had a female householder with no husband present, 4.7% had a male householder with no wife present, and 27.9% were non-families. 23.3% of all households were made up of individuals, and 4.6% had someone living alone who was 65 years of age or older. The average household size was 2.72 and the average family size was 3.19.

The median age in the city was 38.2 years. 29.9% of residents were under the age of 18; 8.6% were between the ages of 18 and 24; 22.2% were from 25 to 44; 31.6% were from 45 to 64; and 7.7% were 65 years of age or older. The gender makeup of the city was 52.1% male and 47.9% female.

2000 census
As of the census of 2000, there were 118 people, 47 households, and 32 families living in the city. The racial makeup of the city was 98.31% White, and 1.69% from two or more races.

There were 47 households, out of which 53.2% had children under the age of 18 living with them, 57.4% were married couples living together, 6.4% had a female householder with no husband present, and 29.8% were non-families. 25.5% of all households were made up of individuals, and 17.0% had someone living alone who was 65 years of age or older. The average household size was 2.51 and the average family size was 3.03.

In the city, the population was spread out, with 31.4% under the age of 18, 6.8% from 18 to 24, 30.5% from 25 to 44, 19.5% from 45 to 64, and 11.9% who were 65 years of age or older. The median age was 34 years. For every 100 females, there were 107.0 males. For every 100 females age 18 and over, there were 88.4 males.

The median income for a household in the city was $38,542, and the median income for a family was $41,667. Males had a median income of $29,306 versus $26,250 for females. The per capita income for the city was $15,611. There were 7.9% of families and 5.8% of the population living below the poverty line, including 5.9% of under eighteens and 11.1% of those over 64.

Education
It is within the New Hampton Community School District.

Notable person
Joe Meyers, American football coach

References

Cities in Chickasaw County, Iowa
Cities in Iowa